Arnold Koreimann (born 19 February 1957) is an Austrian footballer. He played in one match for the Austria national football team in 1982.

References

External links
 

1957 births
Living people
Austrian footballers
Austria international footballers
Place of birth missing (living people)
Association footballers not categorized by position
Association football midfielders
People from Villach-Land
Footballers from Carinthia (state)
FC Wacker Innsbruck players
SK Austria Klagenfurt players
FC Red Bull Salzburg players
FC Swarovski Tirol players